Prozhektor is a rural locality (a village) in Nyuksenskoye Rural Settlement, Nyuksensky District, Vologda Oblast, Russia. The population was 47 as of 2002.

Geography 
Prozhektor is located 3 km southeast of Nyuksenitsa (the district's administrative centre) by road. Nyuksenitsa is the nearest rural locality.

References 

Rural localities in Nyuksensky District